The Odessa metropolitan statistical area, as defined by the United States Census Bureau, is an area consisting of one county, Ector, in West Texas, anchored by the city of Odessa. As of the 2020 census, the MSA had a population of 165,171.

The Odessa metropolitan area is also a component of the Midland–Odessa combined statistical area, which covers two counties (Ector and Midland) and had a population of 335,154 as of 2020.

Counties
Ector

Communities
Gardendale (census-designated place)
City of Goldsmith
City of Odessa (partly in Midland County)
West Odessa (census-designated place)
Penwell (unincorporated)
Pleasant Farms (unincorporated)
Notrees (unincorporated)

See also
Texas census statistical areas

References

Metropolitan areas of Texas